Mitchell Miller (born December 20, 2001) is an American hockey player under contract with the Boston Bruins. He was drafted 111th overall by the Arizona Coyotes in the 2020 NHL Entry Draft, but had his draft status revoked after it emerged that he had repeatedly subjected a disabled black classmate to extreme bullying throughout multiple years of grade school. A commitment to join the University of North Dakota was also ended as a result of the controversy, and in 2021 he joined the Tri-City Storm. In November 2022, he signed an entry-level contract with the Boston Bruins, but the team parted ways with him two days later after intense backlash.

Early life
Miller was born in Sylvania, Ohio on December 20, 2001, to John and Shelli Miller.

Playing career
Starting in 2018, Miller played for the Cedar Rapids RoughRiders in the United States Hockey League (USHL). He played two games during the 2017–18 season, and stayed with the team for the entire 2018–19 season. During the season, he was called up to the United States men's national junior ice hockey team to play in the 2018 World Junior A Challenge. After the end of the 2018–19 USHL season, Miller was traded to the Tri-City Storm. Miller had committed to play for the Miami University men's ice hockey team and was expected to join the Red Hawks for the 2019–20 season. However, he de-committed, and opted to spend the 2019–20 season playing for Tri-City, where he finished the season with 33 points. He also earned an all-USHL first team selection, an honor bestowed on the best players in the league as determined by the votes of the league's general managers. He was once again called up to the United States junior team for the 2019 World Junior A Challenge where he had two goals and four assists in six games. In May 2020, Miller committed to play for the University of North Dakota men's ice hockey team.

At the 2020 NHL Entry Draft, the Arizona Coyotes used their first pick, in the 4th round (111th overall), to select Miller. On October 29, 2020, the Coyotes renounced the draft rights to Miller. The next day, he was dropped from the University of North Dakota hockey team.

On November 4, 2022, Miller signed a three-year, entry-level contract with the Boston Bruins. Two days later, the Bruins parted ways with Miller following considerable pressure from fans and current Bruins players. While the club stated it has severed ties with Miller, he is still technically under contract with the Bruins. As of December 23, 2022, he had earned over $116,000 from that contract. Under the current terms of the deal, he will eventually earn the entire amount that he signed for - $2,775,000.

Bullying incidents
In 2016, Miller and a classmate were found delinquent in an Ohio juvenile court on charges of assault and a violation of the Ohio Safe Schools Act. The pair were accused and found guilty of deceiving a developmentally disabled African American classmate, Isaiah Meyer-Crothers, into eating a piece of candy that they had wiped in a urinal, repeated bullying of Meyer-Crothers, and repeatedly calling him a nigger.  Surveillance video also captured them kicking and punching Meyer-Crothers.

The bullying incidents resurfaced after The Arizona Republic published an in-depth report on Miller on October 26, 2020. The Republic exposé also revealed that Miller would frequently use the words "nigger" and "BROWNIE" to refer to Meyer-Crothers and often told him to "go pick their cotton". The Coyotes initially defended Miller, citing their desire to "be a part of the solution in a real way" and to help Miller grow from this incident and eventually become a leader against bullying and racism. Although Coyotes general manager Bill Armstrong did not draft Miller, he expressed the team's desire to provide Miller with a second chance.

According to the Republic, Miller apologized to the then 31 NHL teams (the Seattle Kraken had not formally joined the league at the time), but never to Meyer-Crothers or to his family. In a letter addressed to the Coyotes, Meyer-Crothers' mother, Joni, found Armstrong's comments demeaning to her son, stating that while Miller's classmate apologized to Meyer-Crothers, Miller himself was unwilling to show remorse. A juvenile court magistrate in Ohio concluded that Miller had absolutely no remorse for his actions against Meyer-Crothers and was merely upset that his reputation would be damaged by the situation. As a result of the exposé, the Coyotes received widespread criticism for drafting Miller. This ultimately led to the Coyotes renouncing their draft rights to Miller and cutting all ties with him. A day later, Miller was dropped from the University of North Dakota's hockey team as well. According to UND president Andrew Armacost, school officials and Miller's family mutually agreed that Miller should no longer be on the team.

More details about the bullying surfaced after The Independent published a detailed letter from the Meyer-Crothers family, reiterating that Miller has not apologized to the family, and detailing further accusations about Miller's behavior, including repeated use of the word "nigger", spitting in Meyer-Crothers' face, and smacking and punching Meyer-Crothers on the school bus starting as early as 1st grade. Miller maintains that his court-mandated apology letter was read to the Meyer-Crothers family. Court record stated that the apology was read both to Meyer-Crothers and to school officials and the school board. The apology was also sent to the Meyer-Crothers family.

Career statistics

Regular season and playoffs

International

Source:

References

External links
 

2001 births
Living people
American men's ice hockey defensemen
Anti-black racism in the United States
Arizona Coyotes draft picks
Cedar Rapids RoughRiders players
Ice hockey players from Ohio
People from Sylvania, Ohio
Tri-City Storm players
Ice hockey controversies